Woodrow Lowe (born June 9, 1954), is an American former professional football player who was a  linebacker from 1976 to 1986 for the San Diego Chargers in the National Football League (NFL). Lowe played college football for the Alabama Crimson Tide under Bear Bryant from 1972 to 1975.

College career
After a stellar career at Central High School in Phenix City, Alabama, Lowe enrolled at the University of Alabama in 1972, where he found instant success. Lowe became one of only two Crimson Tide players to be named an All-American three times (the other being Cornelius Bennett) when he was named an All-American in 1973, 1974, and 1975. Lowe also played on four Southeastern Conference (SEC) championship teams, and one national championship team, while he was at Alabama.

Lowe also holds the Alabama record for most tackles in a season, with 134 stops as a sophomore in 1973. He ranks third all-time in tackles at Alabama, with 315 in his career.

San Diego Chargers
After his time at Alabama, Lowe was chosen by the San Diego Chargers in the 5th round (131st overall pick) in the 1976 NFL Draft.

In his eleven years in San Diego, Lowe was known largely as the epitome of durability and longevity, because he missed only one game in his entire eleven-year NFL career. Moreover, despite his skills in defending the run, Lowe was particularly adept as a pass defender, which is a bit of a rarity for a linebacker. All told, Lowe racked up 21 interceptions as a Charger, and 4 were returned for a touchdown.

Coaching
After retiring from the NFL, Lowe became a football coach. He spent six years in the NFL as a defensive assistant for the Oakland Raiders and the Kansas City Chiefs, and eventually returned to his alma mater as an assistant coach, a stint which included the Red Devils' 1993 state championship. After spending five years with the UAB Blazers, Lowe moved back to the high school ranks and became the head coach for Central's biggest rival, Smiths Station High School. Lowe was removed from his position at Smiths Station by the Lee County Board of Education in 2008 after compiling a total record of 12 wins and 19 losses in only 3 years as head coach. Lowe was an assistant coach at Jackson-Olin High School in Birmingham.

On December 30, 2009 Lowe was named the head coach and returned home to his alma mater, Central High School in Phenix City, AL. He was relieved of his coaching duties in May 2014.

Awards
For his impact through athletics as a player and a coach, Lowe was inducted into the Alabama Sports Hall of Fame.  He was elected to the College Football Hall of Fame in 2009.

Personal life
Lowe is the brother of Eddie Lowe, the mayor of Phenix City.

References

External links
 
 

1954 births
Living people
American football linebackers
Alabama Crimson Tide football players
Kansas City Chiefs coaches
Oakland Raiders coaches
San Diego Chargers players
UAB Blazers football coaches
All-American college football players
College Football Hall of Fame inductees
High school football coaches in Alabama
Sportspeople from Columbus, Georgia
People from Phenix City, Alabama
Players of American football from Alabama
Players of American football from Columbus, Georgia
African-American coaches of American football
African-American players of American football
21st-century African-American people
20th-century African-American sportspeople
Ed Block Courage Award recipients